The twelfth series of Geordie Shore, a British television programme based in Newcastle upon Tyne was confirmed on 23 May 2015 when it was confirmed that MTV had renewed the series for a further three series taking it up to the thirteenth series. The series was filmed in October and November 2015 and began airing on 15 March 2016. This was the first series not to include Kyle Christie since he made his exit during the previous series, and was the first to feature new cast members Chantelle Connelly and Marty McKenna, who had previously appeared during the third series of Ex on the Beach.

Cast
Aaron Chalmers
Chantelle Connelly
Charlotte-Letitia Crosby
Chloe Ferry
Gary Beadle
Holly Hagan
Marnie Simpson
Marty McKenna
Nathan Henry
Scott Timlin

Duration of cast 

 = Cast member is featured in this episode.
 = Cast member arrives in the house.
 = Cast member voluntarily leaves the house.
 = Cast member leaves and returns to the house in the same episode.
 = Cast member returns to the house.
 = Cast member returns to the series.
 = Cast member does not feature in this episode.
 = Cast member is not officially a cast member in this episode.

Episodes

Ratings

References

2016 British television seasons
Series 12